Polyvalent Hall from Piatra Neamț is a multi-purpose indoor arena in Piatra Neamț, Romania. It is primarily used by Volei Club Unic Piatra Neamț. It was opened on 20 November 2011.

Indoor arenas in Romania
Volleyball venues in Romania
Concert halls in Romania